Robert Anthony Scott (born 7 December 1990) is a Scottish professional footballer who currently plays as a left winger for Hong Kong Premier League club HKFC.

References

External links
 Yau Yee Football League profile

Living people
1990 births
Scottish footballers
Association football forwards
Hong Kong First Division League players
Hong Kong Premier League players
Hong Kong FC players
Scottish expatriate footballers
Scottish expatriate sportspeople in Hong Kong
Expatriate footballers in Hong Kong